Motorina Island is an island of Papua New Guinea, part of the Calvados Chain.
It is the highest island in the group. 
The population consists of farmers, raising bananas across the island. The main port is at Riman Bay. 
Other slightly large villages include: Tawara, Mabaraboraboa.

References

Islands of Milne Bay Province
Louisiade Archipelago